The 1923 Sunbeam Grand Prix was an open-wheel Grand Prix race car, designed, developed and built by British manufacturer Sunbeam, for Grand Prix racing, between 1923 and 1924.

References

1923 in motorsport
1924 in motorsport
Sunbeam vehicles
Sunbeams, 1923